Dhulura is a rural area in the New South Wales Riverina close to Wagga Wagga. The locality was gazetted in 2015, and is named after the former Dhulura School which was located in the area

References 

Suburbs of Wagga Wagga